KF Tirana are the Albanian football club with the best performance through all European competitions. They have the most participations, matches, wins, points and experience in Europe among all other Albanian clubs.

Tirana holds the record for the most ties won (13) (once directly by draw, without playing) along their road. They are the most successful Albanian team in European competitions, since making their European debut in the 1965–66 European Cup. They reached Round of 16 four times, of which three times in the European Cup (now Champions League) alone in 1980s, making it the Albanian team to have progressed farthest in any European competition. Tirana is the team that were able to overturn the first leg negative result to their advantage in at least four occasions; worth to remember their great second legs wins against Ħamrun Spartans, FC Bobruisk, Dinamo Tbilisi, ND Gorica; additionally good overturns against Apollon Limassol and Ferencvarosi TC. Even though at 13 attempts they have not passed more than one round, KF Tirana are the Albanian team which has won more ties in Europe throughout their long history. Another significant international result comes at Balkans Cup of season 1981 where they went on the final, but lost both matches against Beroe Stara Zagora.

Along their European road, KF Tirana has met many famous squads in Europe, such as: FC Bayern Munich, Standard Liège, AFC Ajax, Malmö FF, IFK Göteborg, Ferencvárosi TC, PFC CSKA Sofia, etc., and in many of such matches has given unforgettable performances.

Additionally, white and blues hold the all-time record for the highest IFFHS ranking of an Albanian football club, being ranked as high as 31st in the world in 1987, as result of good performances preceded 1986–87. KF Tirana started competing for the first time in the European Cup 1965–66. Below are all matches played and up-to-date rankings.

European performance table

Balkans Cup performance

 QR = Qualifying Round
 1R = 1st round
 2R = 2nd round
 n.p = non participation

By country

 Q = Qualified
 E = Eliminated

UEFA club competition record

Last Update: 01 October 2020

Europe and Balkan total

World and European rankings

UEFA club coefficient ranking
(As of 20 September 2020)

References

Albanian football clubs in international competitions
Europe